Georges Lakhovsky (born Georgei Lakhovsky; ; 17 September 1869  –  31 August 1942) was a Russian-French engineer, author, and inventor.

Life 
Lakhovsky's controversial medical treatment invention, the Multiple Wave Oscillator, is described as having been used by him in the treatment of cancer. The main circuit basically consists of concentric rings forming electrical dipole antennas having capacitive gaps opposing each other by 180° (called Lakhovsky antennas). The circuit is fed with high voltage and high frequency impulses from a generator, usually a spark gap Tesla coil or Oudin coil. If set up correctly, the unit is supposed to create a broad band frequency spectrum of low amplitude, covering a much greater range of frequencies, from 1 Hz to 300 GHz, than those of the exciting generator (usually several 100 kHz to a few MHz from a Tesla transformer or several kilohertz from an induction coil). The power of each individual frequency in this broad band noise spectrum is very low. In order to create more harmonics and sub-harmonics, an additional spark gap on the secondary side has been found in some devices, being mounted directly on the antenna, or being mounted in parallel to the secondary coil.

None of the claimed benefits and effects for health have ever been proven by modern science.

Works 
 The Secret of Life, London: William Heinemann (Medical Books), Ltd., 1939; Modern edition 2007 .
 
 
 La Terre et Nous (The Earth and Us) (in French) 1933; modern edition .

See also

References

Further reading

External links 
 Original George Lakhovsky Multiple Wave Oscillator Reverse Engineered by MultiWaveResearch: https://www.multiwaveresearch.com/
 Lakhovsky Multiple Wave Oscillator, YouTube

1869 births
1942 deaths
20th-century French inventors
20th-century Russian inventors
Alternative cancer treatment advocates
Emigrants from the Russian Empire to the United States
French people of Belarusian descent
Pedestrian road incident deaths
Radionic practitioners
Road incident deaths in New York City